In mathematics, the Zakharov–Schulman system is a system of nonlinear partial differential equations introduced in  to describe the interactions of small amplitude, high frequency waves with acoustic waves.
The equations are

where L1, L2, and L3, are  constant coefficient differential operators.

References

Partial differential equations
Acoustics